= Sheng Kuan Chung =

American art educator

Sheng Kuan Chung (鍾生官) is Professor of Art Education and Visual Culture in the Department of Curriculum and Instruction of the College of Education at the University of Houston and a practicing artist. He has received national distinguished recognition for his contributions to art education, including the 2014 Edwin Ziegfeld Award from the United States Society for Education through Art and the 2025 AACIG Distinguished Scholar Award and the 2019 J. Eugene Grigsby, Jr. Award, both from the National Art Education Association of the United States. Chung has authored over 80 academic publications in art education and visual culture, circulated nationally and internationally.

== Education ==
Chung holds a B.Ed. in Art Education from National Hsinchu Teachers College in Taiwan, an M.A. in Art Education from New York University, and a Ph.D. in Art Education from the University of Illinois at Urbana-Champaign.

== Academic career ==
Chung is a Professor of Art Education and Visual Culture and serves as Art Education Specialization Lead at the University of Houston College of Education, where he has taught for over two decades. His research focuses on the innovative integration of emerging digital technologies and social justice frameworks in art education and visual culture. Chung serves as an editor for the International Journal of Education Through Art, a publication of the International Society for Education through Art (InSEA) published by Intellect Books, and serves as editor-in-chief of Arts & Communication, published by AccScience Publishing. He has also served on the editorial board of Art Education, the official journal of the National Art Education Association.

== Awards and recognition ==
- 2025: Distinguished Scholar Award from the National Art Education Association's Asian Art and Culture Interest Group
- 2019: J. Eugene Grigsby, Jr. Award from the National Art Education Association
- 2014: Edwin Ziegfeld Award from the United States Society for Education through Art

== Artistic practice ==
In addition to his academic work, Chung maintains an active artistic practice. His work was selected for exhibition at Lawndale Art Center's "The Big Show" in 2023, juried by Dr. Kanitra Fletcher. In 2022, he received Best of Show at the Texas Art Education Association Annual Members Art Show.

== Selected academic publications ==
=== Books ===
- Chung, S. K. (2024). Zen Aesthetics: The Art of Teaching, Living, and Being. Amazon Kindle Publishing.
- Chung, S. K. (2012). Teaching Asian Art: Content, Context, and Pedagogy. Reston, VA: National Art Education Association.
- Chung, S. K. (2008). Social Reconstructionism in Art Education: Art, Critical Pedagogy, and Empowerment in a Junior High Setting. Germany: VDM Verlag.

=== Journal articles ===
- Chung, S. K. (in review). Students as theorists: Authorship, human contribution, and cognitive dependency in AI-assisted creative practice. International Journal of Arts Education
- Chung, S. K., & Waleed, A. (in review). Sculpture, hybridity, and mental health: Beyond cultural determinism in art education. International Journal of Education & the Arts.
- Chung, S. K., & Waleed, A. (in review). Co-production of creativity with AI in art education. Visual Inquiry: Learning and Teaching Art.
- Chung, S. K., & Waleed, A. (in review). Sculpture as psychological encounter: Materializing mental health. Art Education.
- Chung, S. K. (2026). Art education as a distributed, relational and lifelong practice [Editorial]. International Journal of Education Through Art, 22(3), 325–329. https://doi.org/10.1386/eta_00250_2
- Chung, S. K. (2026). Digital memes as critical visual pedagogy. International Journal of Arts Education, 24(1), 1-26.
- Chung, S. K., & Cui, Y. (2026). Inflatable public art as environmental pedagogy. Art Education, 79(3), 52–59. https://doi.org/10.1080/00043125.2026.2691678
- Chung, S. K. (2025). AI-enhanced visual analysis: Democratizing access and transforming student learning. International Journal of Arts Education, 23(2), 1-40.
- Chung, C. C., & Chung, S. K. (2025). Decolonizing digital spaces: A critical framework for AI in culturally responsive art education. International Journal of Arts Education,23(2), 41-94.
- Chung, S. K. (2025). Art Education for Environmental Advocacy: A Lesson Intervention with AI. International Journal of Arts Education, 23(1), 1-48.
- Xian, X., & Chung, S. K. (2025). Street sign art as a form of visual communication for increasing critical consciousness, International Journal of Arts Education, 23(1), 81-131.
- Chung, S. K. (2025). "Through Art, a Journey to Voice, Identity, and Justice". NAEA News: 44–45.
- Li, D.; Chung, S. K. (2025). "Fostering Community Belonging through STEAM Education: Board Game Design in a University Art Appreciation Course". Arts & Communication: 4437. doi:10.36922/ac.4437.
- Chung, S. K. (2024). "The Impact of Artificial Intelligence on Art Education: A Narrative Review". International Journal of Arts Education. 22 (1): 1–37.
- Chung, S. K. (2024). "Exploring Pleasure, Ideology, and Interplay in Students' Visual Culture: A Constructivist Inquiry". International Journal of Arts Education. 22 (2): 1–36.
- Chung, S. K.; Li, D. (2024). "Fostering Intercultural Understanding through the Chinese Red Envelope: Implementing Culturally Responsive Pedagogy in Diverse Art Classrooms". International Journal of Arts Education. 22 (2): 37–76.
- Li, D.; Chung, S. K. (2023). "Exploring Gender and Sexuality Issues in Visual Culture: A Case Study on Artivist Animations and Games". International Journal of Arts Education. 21 (2): 31–84.
- Chung, S. K.; Allen, A. (2023). "Talking Back with the Work of Aram Han Sifuentes". Art Education. 76 (6): 40–47.
- Chung, S. K. (2023). "Satire as a Catalyst for Creativity, Critical Thinking, and Social Awareness". International Journal of Arts Education. 21 (2): 1–30.
- Chung, S. K. (2023). "Art Education for Social Justice: A Lesson on Deconstructing Oppression". International Journal of Arts Education. 21 (1): 1–29.
- Chung, S. K.; Li, D. (2022). "A Claymation Project for Integrated Art Learning". International Journal of Arts Education. 20 (2): 1–45.
- Chung, S. K.; Li, D. (2022). "Building Bitmoji Art Rooms amid the COVID-19 Pandemic". International Journal of Arts Education. 20 (1): 1–40.
- Chung, S. K.; Li, D. (2021). "Issues-Based STEAM Education: A Case Study in a Hong Kong Secondary School". International Journal of Education & the Arts. 19 (2): 1–44.
- Chung, S. K.; Li, D. (2021). "Pre-Service Art Teachers' Perspectives on Building Virtual Art Gallery Exhibitions". International Journal of Arts Education. 19 (1): 1–46.
- Chung, S. K.; Li, D. (2020). "Social Reconstructionist Art Education: Exploring Homeless Issues with Elementary Students". International Journal of Arts Education. 18 (1): 86–110.
- Chung, S. K.; Li, D. (2020). "Socially Engaged Art Education: Exploring Issues of Homelessness in an Elementary Art Classroom". International Journal of Education & the Arts. 21 (21). doi:10.26209/ijea21n21.
- Chung, S. K. (2020). "Is Art Always Political?". ArtHouston. 11: 16–17.
- Chung, S. K.; Li, D. (2019). "Sexism in Hip-Hop Culture: Exploitation of Sexism by Graffiti Female Artists". International Journal of Arts Education. 17 (2): 44–82.
- Chung, S. K.; Li, D. (2019). "Examining the Functionality and Aesthetics of Emojis". International Journal of Arts Education. 17 (1): 1–32.
- Chung, S. K.; Li, D. (2019). "Culturally Responsive Art Education". Advisory of the National Art Education Association.
- Xian, X.; Chung, S. K. (2018). "The American Drawing Books in the 19th Century: A Historical Inquiry". International Journal of Arts Education. 16 (2): 97–124.
- Chung, S. K. (2018). "Art Education from the Street to the Classroom". International Journal of Arts Education. 16 (2): 1–21.
- Chung, S. K. (2018). "Critical Cybermedia Literacy in Art Education". International Journal of Arts Education. 16 (1): 1–30.
- Chung, S. K. (2018). "Approaches to Teaching Critical Visual Literacy". Advisory of the National Art Education Association.
- Chung, S. K.; Li, D. (2018). "Art Education within Funding Limitations". Advisory of the National Art Education Association.
- Li, D.; Chung, S. K. (2018). "Digital Learning Tools for Art Teachers". Advisory of the National Art Education Association.
- Chung, S. K.; Brown, K. (2018). "The Washed Ashore Project: Saving the Ocean through Art". Art Education. 71 (2): 54–58.
- Chung, S. K.; Li, D. (2017). "An Artistic and Spiritual Exploration of Chinese Joss Paper". Art Education. 70 (6): 28–35.
- Chung, S. K.; Li, D. (2017). "Art in Daily Living: The Playful Work of Tin Yan Wong". Art Education. 70 (5): 57–62.
- Chung, S. K.; Li, D. (2016). "Classroom Intervention on Teaching Students with Special Needs". Advisory of the National Art Education Association.
- Brown, K.; Chung, S. K. (2016). "Art Up Close: Maximizing the Museum Field Trip". Advisory of the National Art Education Association.
- Chung, S. K. (2014). "Looking at Art Teaching through Zen Aesthetics". Visual Arts Research (Special Issue).
- Chung, S. K. (2013). "Critical Visual Literacy". International Journal of Arts Education. 10 (1): 1–36.
- Chung, S. K. (2012). "A Picture Tells a Thousand Stories: Using Staged Photography to Promote Dialogue on Social Issues in an Art Education Classroom". International Journal of Arts Education. 10 (1): 1–35.
- Chung, S. K.; Ortiz, C. (2011). "Art Education in Action on the Street". Art Education. 64 (3): 46–52.
- Chung, S. K. (2009). "Autobiographical Portraits of Four Female Adolescents: Implications for Teaching Critical Visual Culture". International Journal of Education & the Arts. 10 (11).
- Chung, S. K. (2009). "An Art of Resistance, from the Street to the Classroom". Art Education. 62 (4): 25–32.
- Chung, S. K. (2009). "Logos Deconstruction and Culture Jamming". The 2009 International Education & Art Design Symposium. College of Arts at Nanhua University. pp. 11–20.
- Chung, S. K. (2009). "Presenting Cultural Artifacts in the Art Museum: A University-Museum Collaboration". Art Education. 62 (3): 33–39.
- Chung, S. K.; Kirby, M. (2009). "Media Literacy Art Education: Logos, Cultural Jamming, and Activism". Art Education. 62 (1): 34–39.
- Lee, M.; Chung, S. K. (2009). "A Semiotic Reading and Discourse Analysis of Postmodern Street Performance". Studies in Art Education. 51 (1): 21–35.
- Chung, S. K.; Ortiz, C. (2009). "Teaching Photography in the K-12 Classroom Setting". Advisory of the National Art Education Association.
- Chung, S. K.; Ortiz, C. (2008). "Zooming in on Nature: A Closer Look at the Food Chain". Art Education. 61 (5): 25–32.
- Chung, S. K. (2008). "An Exploration of the Issue of Stereotyping in the Artroom". Art Education. 61 (3): 20–24.
- Chung, S. K. (2007). "Media/Visual Literacy Art Education: Sexism in Hip-Hop Music Videos". Art Education. 60 (3): 33–38.
- Chung, S. K. (2007). "An Exploration of Media Violence in a Junior High Art Classroom". International Journal of Education Through Art. 3 (1): 57–68.
- Chung, S. K. (2007). "Media Literacy Art Education: Deconstructing Lesbian and Gay Stereotypes in the Media". International Journal of Art & Design Education. 26 (1): 98–107.
- Chung, S. K. (2007). "Art Education Technology: Digital Storytelling". Art Education. 60 (2): 17–22.
- Chung, S. K.; Ortiz, C. (2007). "Teaching Art on a Limited Budget". Advisory of the National Art Education Association.
- Chung, S. K. (2007). "The Path to Spiritual Enlightenment: Chi in Brushwork Practice". Journal of the Sumi-e Society of America. 230: 14–19.
- Chung, S. K. (2006). "Young Adolescents' Imagery Preferences in Art Appraisal". Research in Arts Education. 11: 53–72.
- Chung, S. K. (2006). "Aesthetic Practice and Spirituality: Chi in Traditional East Asian Brushwork". Art Education. 59 (4): 33–38.
- Chung, S. K. (2006). "Digital Storytelling in Integrated Arts Education". International Journal of Arts Education. 4 (1): 33–63.
- Chung, S. K. (2005). "Media/Visual Literacy Art Education: Cigarette Ad Deconstruction". Art Education. 58 (3): 19–24.
- Chung, S. K. (2004). "Art Education in Cyberspace: Strategies for Implementation". Aesthetic Education. 141: 89–95.
- Chung, S. K. (2003). "The Challenge of Presenting Cultural Artifacts in a Museum Setting". Art Education. 56 (1): 13–18.
- Chung, S. K. (2003). "The Application of Dialogue for Teaching Art Appreciation". Aesthetic Education. 131: 70–75.
- Chung, S. K. (1992). "The Ideas of the 20th Century Art: The Interpretation of Marcel Duchamp's Work". The Arts and Literature in Pingtung: 8–9.

=== Book chapters ===
- Chung, S. K. (2023). "Teaching Critical Media Literacy". In Bae-Dimitriadis, M.; Ivashkevich, O. (eds.). Teaching Civic Participation with Digital Media in Art Education: Critical Approaches for Classrooms and Communities. National Art Education Association. pp. 88–101.
- Chung, S. K. (2012). "Spirituality in Asian Aesthetics". In Chung, S. K. (ed.). Teaching Asian Art: Content, Context, and Pedagogy. National Art Education Association. pp. 133–138.
- Chung, S. K. (2012). "Children's Playdolls as Pedagogical Sites for Art Education". In Bolin, P. E.; Blandy, D. (eds.). Matter Matters: Art Education and Material Culture Studies. National Art Education Association. pp. 147–153.
- Chung, S. K. (2011). "Cybermedia Literacy Art Education". In Sweeny, R. (ed.). Digital Visual Culture: Intersections and Interactions in 21st Century Art Education. National Art Education Association. pp. 63–71.
- Chung, S. K. (2009). "Aesthetics of Confrontation: From the Street to the Classroom". In Fehr, D.; Fehr, M. (eds.). Teach Boldly! Letters to Teachers about Contemporary Issues in Education. New York: Peter Lang. pp. 95–103.
- Chung, S. K. (2009). "Art Education and Cybermedia Spectacles in the Age of Globalization". In Delacruz, E.; Arnold, A.; Kuo, A.; Parsons, M. (eds.). Globalization, Art, and Education. National Art Education Association. pp. 186–192.
- Chung, S. K. (2006). "The Challenges and Promises of Visual Culture Art Education". In Duncum, P. (ed.). Visual Culture in the Art Class: Case Studies. National Art Education Association. pp. 109–116.
- Chung, S. K. (2006). "Becoming a Social Reconstructionist Art Educator". Work, Pedagogy, and Change: Foundations for the Art Teacher Educator. National Art Education Association. pp. 126–132.
- Chung, S. K. (2004). "Zen (Ch'an) and Aesthetic Education". In Diaz, G.; McKenna, M. (eds.). Teaching for Aesthetic Experience: The Art of Learning. New York: Peter Lang. pp. 33–47.

=== Published book reviews ===
- Chung, S. K.; Ortiz, C. (2009). "Review of Why Is That Art?: Aesthetics and Criticism of Contemporary Art". Visual Arts Research.
- Chung, S. K. (April 2008). "Review of Painting Chinese: A Lifelong Teacher Gains the Wisdom of Youth". National Art Education Association News. 50 (2): 21.
- Chung, S. K. (2003). "Cultural Artifacts in the Art Museum: Some Unresolved Issues". Art Education. 56 (5): 24.
- Chung, S. K. (August 2002). "Review of Getting It: A Guide to Understanding and Appreciating Art". National Art Education Association News.
- Chung, S. K. (December 2002). "Review of Exploding Aesthetics: Series of Philosophy of Art and Art Theory, Vol. 16". National Art Education Association News.

=== Technical reports ===
- Chung, S. K. (2002). Principles of Contemporary Art Appreciation and Interpretation (Report). Taiwan: National Culture and Arts Foundation.
